Washington County Courthouse is a historic courthouse building located at 95 West Washington Street in Hagerstown, Washington County, Maryland, United States. It is a two-story red brick structure with white trim and decorative work in brownstone, constructed in 1872 in the Italianate style. The building features a central tower on the front façade above the main entrance and a coursed limestone foundation from an earlier courthouse which burned. It also has a mansard roof covered with shingles. The annex was built in 1963.

It was listed on the National Register of Historic Places in 1974.

References

External links 
, including undated photo, at Maryland Historical Trust

Courthouses on the National Register of Historic Places in Maryland
Buildings and structures in Hagerstown, Maryland
County courthouses in Maryland
Government buildings completed in 1872
Italianate architecture in Maryland
Individually listed contributing properties to historic districts on the National Register in Maryland
National Register of Historic Places in Washington County, Maryland
Historic district contributing properties in Maryland